Vlada Kubassova (born 23 August 1995) is an Estonian professional footballer who plays as a forward for Serie A club FC Como Women and the Estonia women's national team.

International goals

References

External links

1995 births
Living people
Estonian women's footballers
Women's association football forwards
FC Levadia Tallinn (women) players
S.S.D. Napoli Femminile players
Serie A (women's football) players
Estonia women's international footballers
Estonian expatriate footballers
Estonian expatriate sportspeople in Italy
Expatriate women's footballers in Italy
S.S.D. F.C. Como Women players